Eretz Nehederet is an Israeli prime-time television satirical sketch comedy show, that premiered on Keshet's Channel 2 in 2003. It features satirical references to current affairs of the past week through parodies of the people involved, as well as the thoughts of recurring characters. The program's concept is inspired by Saturday Night Live, The Daily Show and others. The program is one of the most watched and influential shows on Israeli TV. It is also one of the longest-running scripted shows in Israeli television to date, running for 20 seasons as of 2022. Beginning with Season 15, the program is aired on Keshet 12, in HDTV.

It was first filmed in Tel Aviv, and in later seasons, was filmed in the neighboring Herzliya.

The show features a regular cast of comedians and actors, including Tal Friedman (11 first seasons), Eyal Kitzis (the Jon Stewart-type host), Alma Zak, Orna Banai (6 first seasons), Shani Cohen (season 5 and on), Asi Cohen, Eli Finish, Mariano Edelman, Yuval Semo, Roey Bar-Natan, Eran Zarachovitch, Yaron Berlad, Maor Cohen and Dov Navon (4 first seasons). During the third season, Asi Cohen started doing small roles on the show, and by the beginning of the fourth season (fall 2006), Cohen became a regular member.

Eretz Nehederet won the Israeli Television Academy's "Best Entertainment Program" in 2004 and again in 2006, and attracts millions of viewers every season. In a May 2008 poll, web surfers selected all the Season 5 Eretz Nehederet actors from into the top 60 Israeli comedians list. The top 7 spots were all taken by Eretz Nehederet, as well as #9 and #20.

In 2010, Erez Nehederet produced a satire feature film called Zohi Sdom.

Recurring parodies 
Uzi Cohen, former deputy mayor of Ra'anana and Likud central committee member, by Eli Finish
Benjamin Netanyahu by Edelman
Judy Shalom Nir-Mozes, wife of former Foreign Minister Silvan Shalom, by Orna Banai
Shimon Peres by Eli Finish
Pnina Rosenblum, model and sometime politician, by Edelman
Shelly Yachimovich, journalist-turned-politician (under the name Helly), by Tal Friedman

Characters
Following is a list of characters shown in Eretz Nehederet, both parodied real-life persons, and entirely fictional characters.

Notable sketches

In May 2010, a sketch played off tensions between Israeli Prime Minister Benjamin Netanyahu and American President Barack Obama, with Netanyahu trying to smooth over differences as they meet in the White House. A series of accidents caused Netanyahu to set the American flag on fire, stomp on it, and then torch a copy of Obama's proposed Middle East peace plan.

In November 2010, the group used the video game characters Angry Birds in a mock up peace treaty sketch. The skit satirized recent failed Israeli-Palestinian peace attempts. The video quickly went viral across the world. It received favorable coverage from a variety of independent blogs such as Digital Trends, Hot Air, and Intomobile, as well as from online news media agencies such as The Christian Science Monitor, Haaretz, The Guardian, and MSNBC.

In May 2016, the group created the "ISIS at the Eurovision" sketch.

Reactions
Muhammad Abu Tir of Hamas has expressed his discontent with the way he was represented on the program (as a terrorist disguised as a party arranger, who constantly invites Israelis to his "parties" while rolling his eyes).

In a speech on March 21, 2013, President Barack Obama quipped that "any drama between me and my friend, Bibi, over the years was just a plot to create material for Eretz Nehederet. [...] That's the only thing that was going on. We just wanted to make sure the writers had good material."

Canadian journalist and podcaster Malcolm Gladwell discussed the show on his podcast Revisionist History in an episode on satire. Gladwell discusses his own sadness at how American comedians like Tina Fey use satire to mock but never wish to have their point get across, and cites Eretz Nehederet as a key example of political satire done right.

References

External links
Eretz Nehederet on IMDb
Official website (in Hebrew)
Full Episodes (in Hebrew)
Interview with Alma Zak (in Hebrew)
Background article on the show
Overview of the show (New York Times)

Israeli satirical television series
2003 Israeli television series debuts
Israeli political satire
News parodies
2000s satirical television series
2010s satirical television series
Channel 2 (Israeli TV channel) original programming
Viral videos
Hebrew-language television shows
Channel 12 (Israel) original programming